Kolbenschmidt Arena is an arena in Heilbronn, Germany. It is primarily used for hockey. Kolbenschmidt Arena opened in 2002 and has a viewer capacity of 4,000.

External links 

Indoor arenas in Germany
Indoor ice hockey venues in Germany
Buildings and structures in Heilbronn
Sports venues in Baden-Württemberg